Mark Richard Hamill (born September 25, 1951) is an American actor and writer. He is known for his role as Luke Skywalker in the Star Wars film series, beginning with the original 1977 film and subsequently winning three Saturn Awards for his performances in The Empire Strikes Back (1980), Return of the Jedi (1983),  and The Last Jedi (2017). His other film appearances include Corvette Summer (1978) and The Big Red One (1980). Hamill has also appeared on stage in several theater productions, primarily during the 1980s.

He is a prolific voice actor who has portrayed characters in numerous animated television series, films and video games. Hamill is known for his long-standing role as the Joker in various DC Comics projects, commencing with Batman: The Animated Series. He has also voiced the Hobgoblin in Spider-Man, Fire Lord Ozai in Avatar: The Last Airbender and Skips in Regular Show.

Early life
Mark Richard Hamill was born on September 25, 1951, in Oakland, California, to Virginia Suzanne (née Johnson) and William Thomas Hamill, a U.S. Navy Captain. He is one of seven children, having two brothers, Will and Patrick, and four sisters, Terry, Jan, Jeanie, and Kim. His father has Irish, Scottish, and Welsh ancestry and his mother was of half Swedish and half English descent. Hamill has described his father as a staunch Roman Catholic, and "Nixon Republican".

His father's changes of station and attendant family moves led to the Hamill children switching schools often. In his elementary years, he went to Walsingham Academy in Williamsburg, Virginia, and Edgar Allan Poe Middle School in Annandale, Virginia. At age 11, he moved to the 5900 block of Castleton Drive in San Diego, California, where he attended Hale Junior High School. During his first year at James Madison High School in San Diego, his family moved back to Virginia, and Hamill attended Annandale High School. By his junior year, his father was stationed in Japan, where Hamill attended and was a member of the Drama Club at Nile C. Kinnick High School, from which he graduated in 1969. He later enrolled at Los Angeles City College, majoring in drama.

Career

Beginnings
Hamill's early career included a recurring role on the soap opera General Hospital, and a starring role on the short-lived sitcom The Texas Wheelers. He portrayed the oldest son, David, in the pilot episode of Eight Is Enough, though the role was later performed by Grant Goodeve. He also had guest appearances on The Bill Cosby Show, The Partridge Family, Room 222 and One Day at a Time. He appeared in multiple television films such as The City, and Sarah T. – Portrait of a Teenage Alcoholic.

Star Wars

Robert Englund was auditioning for a role in Apocalypse Now when he walked across the hall where auditions were taking place for George Lucas's Star Wars. After watching the auditions for a while, he realized that Hamill, his friend, would be perfect for the role of Luke Skywalker. He suggested to Hamill that he audition for the role; as it turned out, Hamill's agent had already set up the audition that gave him the role.

Released in May 1977, Star Wars was an enormous, unexpected success and had a huge effect on the film industry. Hamill also appeared in the less-than-successful Star Wars Holiday Special in 1978 and later starred in the successful sequels The Empire Strikes Back and Return of the Jedi. During the time between the first two films, Hamill was involved in a serious automobile accident, fracturing his nose and left cheekbone. False rumors spread that he required plastic surgery on his face. For both of the sequels, Hamill was honored with the Saturn Award for Best Actor given by the Academy of Science Fiction, Fantasy and Horror Films.

Hamill reprised the role of Luke Skywalker for the radio dramatizations of both Star Wars and The Empire Strikes Back. For the Return of the Jedi radio drama, the role was played by a different actor.

Editions of Joseph Campbell's The Hero with a Thousand Faces (which influenced Lucas as he was developing the films) issued after the release of Star Wars in 1977 used the image of Hamill as Luke Skywalker on the cover.

Hamill has appeared in several documentaries including The Making of Star Wars and Empire of Dreams: The Story of the Star Wars Trilogy. He also narrated the 1983 documentary, From Star Wars to Jedi: The Making of a Saga.

Hamill returned to the Star Wars universe in 2014, when he voiced the ancient Sith Lord Darth Bane, in the last episode of season 6 of the animated series The Clone Wars. He was nominated for a Daytime Emmy Award for his performance.

With the acquisition of Lucasfilm by The Walt Disney Company, a Disney press release was announced that there would be more Star Wars films starting with The Force Awakens, which was released on December 18, 2015. Initially, both Disney and Hamill were coy about whether Hamill would be a cast member of The Force Awakens. It was reported that Hamill had been assigned a nutritionist and personal trainer to work with ahead of production. In September 2013, Hamill's friend Robert Englund confirmed that "they've got Mark in the gym because Mark's coming back as Luke Skywalker." Despite having top billing, Hamill only appears briefly at the end of the film (with no dialogue) in a cliffhanger set-up for the sequel.

Hamill played Skywalker again in Star Wars: The Last Jedi, released on December 15, 2017. Hamill was initially critical of his own role in the film, stating that he and director Rian Johnson had "a fundamental difference" on Skywalker's characterization. Hamill later expressed regret for having made those statements, calling the film an "all-time great", and reprised his role as Skywalker again in Star Wars: The Rise of Skywalker.

Hamill also had brief vocal cameos as Dobbu Scay in The Last Jedi, Boolio in The Rise of Skywalker, EV-9D9 in fifth episode of The Mandalorian as well in Rogue One, Solo: A Star Wars Story and The Force Awakens in undisclosed roles, for which he was credited as "William M. Patrick" and "Patrick Williams".

Hamill was digitally de-aged to reprise his role as Luke Skywalker in the Season 2 finale of The Mandalorian and the sixth chapter of the spin-off series The Book of Boba Fett. He also appeared in Disney Gallery: The Mandalorian and The Book of Boba Fett.

Other work

After the success of Star Wars, Hamill found that audiences identified him very closely with the role of Luke Skywalker, after which he became a teen idol and appeared on teen magazine covers such as Tiger Beat and others. He attempted to avoid typecasting by appearing in the 1978 film Corvette Summer and the better-known 1980 World War II film The Big Red One. In 1980, he also made a guest appearance on The Muppet Show, both as himself and as Luke Skywalker in The Stars of Star Wars; this episode also starred C-3PO and R2-D2 who were along with him on a search for Chewbacca. Other film appearances around this time include The Night the Lights Went Out in Georgia in 1981 and Britannia Hospital in 1982. To further distance himself from his early blockbuster role, Hamill started acting on Broadway, starring in plays such as The Elephant Man in 1979, Amadeus in 1983, Harrigan 'N Hart in 1985 (for which he received a Drama Desk Award nomination), Room Service in 1986 and The Nerd in 1987–88. When Amadeus was adapted to film in 1984, Hamill auditioned to reprise the role for the big screen but lost the part to Tom Hulce. A studio executive told the producers of the film, "I don't want Luke Skywalker in this film". He made television appearances in a 1986 episode of Amazing Stories and a 1987 episode of Alfred Hitchcock Presents.

Hamill returned to film after a six-year hiatus with the 1989 science fiction film Slipstream. He continued to star in films throughout the 1990s, including in such films as the thriller Midnight Ride, The Guyver in 1991, the 1995 remake of Village of the Damned, and the 1998 Swedish action film Hamilton. Hamill appeared in the 2001 film Jay and Silent Bob Strike Back as the supervillain Cocknocker, a role which parodies both himself and roles he has played in the past.

He made guest appearances in two episodes as the Trickster in the live-action 1990 television series of The Flash. He has made cameo appearances on MADtv, where he played the estranged father of Ms. Swan, and appeared on Saturday Night Live playing himself being sold on a Star Wars-themed home shopping sale. Hamill appeared in single episodes of 3rd Rock from the Sun in 1997, Just Shoot Me! in 1998 and in two episodes of seaQuest DSV in 1995 (as Tobias LeConte). He also appeared in the episode "Mind over Matter" of the 1995 television series The Outer Limits.

When the Wing Commander series of computer games started using full motion video cut scenes, Hamill was cast as the series protagonist, Colonel Christopher Blair, a role he played in Wing Commander III: Heart of the Tiger, Wing Commander IV: The Price of Freedom and Wing Commander: Prophecy. In the 1999 Wing Commander film, set earlier in the series, the character was played by Freddie Prinze, Jr., although Hamill had a voice cameo. Hamill appears in Squadron 42, the single player campaign from the Star Citizen computer game universe as Lieutenant Commander Steve "Old Man" Colton.

In 2003, Hamill starred in the two-hander play Six Dance Lessons in Six Weeks as the acerbic dance instructor Michael Minetti. He played opposite Rue McClanahan for the season at the Coconut Grove Playhouse in Miami, and opposite Polly Bergen as the production moved on to Broadway.

Hamill also directed and starred in the 2004 direct-to-DVD Comic Book: The Movie. A comic book fan who attended science fiction and comic conventions before he became famous, Hamill stated that his character was based on an exaggerated version of himself. He and his crew shot most of the "mockumentary" film during the 2002 San Diego Comic-Con and enlisted Stan Lee, Kevin Smith, Bruce Campbell and Hugh Hefner in small roles. The movie won an award for Best Live-Action DVD Premiere Movie at the 2005 DVD Exclusive Awards.

In 2011, Hamill appeared as a villain in the fifth season of the NBC series Chuck.

Hamill also appeared in the television series Criminal Minds in the last two episodes of season eight as John Curtis, also known as "The Replicator", a serial killer who has been stalking the BAU team throughout the show's eighth season. He also made a guest appearance alongside George Takei on the season one finale of the ABC sitcom The Neighbors as Commandant Bill.

Hamill did not star in any live-action films for a number of years until 2011 when he starred in the Hungarian film Thelomeris, on which he also served as a creative consultant. The film was the first mainstream science fiction film to be produced in Hungary.

The next year, Hamill starred in two more live-action films, British horror film Airborne and the small independent film Sushi Girl. Airborne was met with a negative reception from critics and audiences. Hamill said in an interview that Sushi Girl was a great challenge for him as it took him out of his comfort zone since it was such a dark film. He did not accept the role until he got encouragement from his daughter, who said he would be crazy not to accept it.

In 2014, Hamill played James Arnold, an academic professor from Imperial College London and an expert in climate change, in the film Kingsman: The Secret Service. In addition, he reprised his role as the Trickster on The CW's 2014 live-action series The Flash, in the seventeenth episode of the first season, the ninth episode of the second season, and the ninth episode of the third season.

He starred in the 2018 film Con Man, an independent film about the life of Barry Minkow, the famous con man. Hamill played Minkow's father, Robert Minkow.

Hamill appeared in second season of historical fiction drama series Knightfall, premiered in 2019. His role is Master Talus, a veteran Templar who trains the initiates at the Chartres Temple.

He is set to make an appearance on the revival of The Kids in the Hall, releasing on Amazon Prime Video on May 13, 2022.

Voice acting

General work
Hamill first did voice acting work in the early 1970s voicing the character Corey Anders on the Saturday morning cartoon Jeannie by Hanna-Barbera Productions. He later played Sean in the Ralph Bakshi film Wizards, which was released just three months before Star Wars in 1977.

Though the voice role he is most known for is Batman's archenemy the Joker, his success as the Joker has led him to portray a wide variety of characters in television, film, anime, and video games (mostly similar super-villains).

Hamill was the voice of The Hobgoblin in the 1990s Spider-Man animated series, and his other Marvel superhero genre roles include the Gargoyle in the animated series of The Incredible Hulk, Maximus in Fantastic Four, Klaw in Avengers: Earth's Mightiest Heroes and multiple characters in Ultimate Spider-Man. Hamill voiced Solomon Grundy and Trickster in the DC animated universe series Justice League and Justice League Unlimited, the murderous gangster Tony Zucco in The Batman, an animated series unrelated to the various DC animated universe series. He voiced Spectre in an episode of Batman: The Brave and the Bold.

Non-comic related television roles include the deranged shock jock anchorman Dr. Jak in Phantom 2040, Principal John Smith in Totally Spies episode "Soul Collector", Christopher "Maverick" Blair in Wing Commander Academy, the classic Walter Lantz character Buzz Buzzard in The New Woody Woodpecker Show, the flamboyant robot Lawrance "Larry" 3000 in Time Squad, the pirate Captain Stickybeard in Codename: Kids Next Door, Fire Lord Ozai in Avatar: The Last Airbender, the evil Skeleton King in Super Robot Monkey Team Hyperforce Go!, multiple roles in Metalocalypse and the groundskeeper Skips in Regular Show. He also voiced himself in two episodes of the Disney animated series Pepper Ann.

He guest-starred in The Simpsons episode "Mayored to the Mob" as himself. On the audio commentary of the episode, he says that he has been a fan of the show since it debuted in 1987 on The Tracy Ullman Show and that it was a personal thrill to work with Dan Castellaneta, the voice of Homer Simpson. He has also guest-starred in Family Guy and was also a recurring voice actor on Seth Green's Robot Chicken.

Aside from voice acting on television, Hamill has starred in multiple animated films. Some of these roles include The Captain of the Guard in Sinbad: Beyond the Veil of Mists, the biblical figure Judah in Joseph: King of Dreams, the evil wolf Niju in Balto II: Wolf Quest and Chanukah Zombie in Futurama: Bender's Big Score. Hamill has done voice acting in English dubs of two Studio Ghibli films. He voiced Colonel Muska in the second English-language version of Castle in the Sky and the Mayor of Pejite in Nausicaä of the Valley of the Wind, both directed by Hayao Miyazaki and distributed by Disney.

His video game voice roles include Detective Mosely in Gabriel Knight: Sins of the Fathers and Gabriel Knight 3: Blood of the Sacred, Blood of the Damned, Assistant Director Wilson in Soldier of Fortune II: Double Helix, Adrian Ripburger in the LucasArts game Full Throttle, two installments of Crash Bandicoot series, Wolverine in X2: Wolverine's Revenge, which was the tie-in game to the film X2, Goro Majima in Yakuza, Malefor The Dark Master in The Legend of Spyro: Dawn of the Dragon, The Watcher in Darksiders, and Master Eraqus in Kingdom Hearts Birth by Sleep and Kingdom Hearts III. The creator of Kingdom Hearts, Tetsuya Nomura, is a big fan of all of Hamill's work. There is also another character, Master Xehanort, who was originally voiced by Leonard Nimoy, the actor of Spock. Tetsuya Nomura stated that they wanted the two for the roles, as the two characters are rivals, referencing the rivalry between fans of Star Wars and fans of Star Trek. After Nimoy died, he was replaced by Rutger Hauer for Kingdom Hearts III, who in turn was replaced by Christopher Lloyd following his death for the Re Mind downloadable content, as Lloyd also appeared in Star Trek as Commander Kruge. He also narrated Call of Duty 2: Big Red One, the title being a reference to the 1980 war film he starred in.

Hamill is credited as the narrator in Ancient Voices, a 1999 series of documentaries on archaeology and ancient history produced by as a BBC/The Learning Channel co-production, and published by Time-Life as a DVD series. He also narrated the Medal of Honor and Silver Star citations of Tibor Rubin, Ralph E. Pomeroy, John Finnigan and Mitchell Red Cloud Jr. for the 2013 Korean War documentary Finnigan's War directed by Conor Timmis.

Hamill voiced the character of Todd Wainio in World War Z, a critically acclaimed audiobook based on Max Brooks' novel of the same name. He also provided the entire cast of voices for a 1983 audiobook version of Pinocchio with unique characteristics for each. Hamill also reads life into the characters of the popular juvenile fiction book series, The Spiderwick Chronicles Volumes I–III, by Holly Black and Tony DiTerlizzi.

In 2009, Hamill voiced Elder Orin in Battle for Terra. He also narrated the 2017 science fiction TV series Dimension 404.

In 2019, Hamill voiced the character Chucky in the Child's Play remake and the Skeksis scientist skekTek in The Dark Crystal: Age of Resistance, a web television prequel series to the 1982 Jim Henson film The Dark Crystal. In 2021, Hamill voiced the character tailor Art Rosenbaum in the animated adaptation of Robert Kirkman's Invincible series and Skeletor in Masters of the Universe: Revelation. He is also set to reprise the role for the follow to Revelation titled Masters of the Universe: Revolution.

In character as Luke Skywalker, Hamill voices the English versions of the Ukrainian air raid warning app.

As the Joker
Hamill's role as the Joker began in the 1992 series Batman: The Animated Series and continued to many later spin-off series, video games and films. Hamill received critical acclaim for his performance, which put him in high demand as a voice-over actor of cartoon villains.

Hamill voiced the Joker in fourteen episodes of Batman: The Animated Series, three episodes of Superman: The Animated Series, five episodes of The New Batman Adventures, five episodes of Justice League, an episode of Static Shock, and a few segments in Robot Chicken. He also voiced the Joker in the 1993 theatrical film Batman: Mask of the Phantasm and the 2000 direct-to-video film Batman Beyond: Return of the Joker.

The short-lived The WB live-action series Birds of Prey, based on the comic book of the same title, featured a flashback sequence in which the Joker shoots Barbara Gordon and paralyzes her. This sequence featured Hamill voicing Joker, dubbed over actor/stuntman Roger Stoneburner whose facial structure more resembled the character.

Hamill voiced the Joker alongside his Batman: The Animated Series co-star Kevin Conroy as Batman and Jason Hillhouse as Dick Grayson in a feature of a storyboard scene included in the 2005 Special Edition DVD of Tim Burton's 1989 film Batman. This scene depicted the origin of Robin, which was not filmed because the producers felt it was out-of-place with the rest of the film.

Hamill has said that he has voiced the Joker for toys and amusement park rides. Although these jobs did not pay particularly well, he enjoyed even these small roles and admitted being protective of the character, preferring not to let "others sleep in my sleeping bag"; he also self-identifies as a "real comic book nerd".

Hamill has portrayed the Joker in a few Batman-themed video games, beginning with 2001's Batman Vengeance, the Sega CD version of The Adventures of Batman & Robin (which was later used to create a "lost" episode of the animated series) and in Batman: Arkham Asylum. Hamill again reprised the role in the Arkham sequel, Batman: Arkham City. In May 2010, Hamill declared to IGN that his role in Arkham City would be his last as the Joker. Some months later, with the announcement of Arkham City, he clarified his statements in the interview by saying, via his Twitter account, "Only said Arkham Asylum would be hard to top, not that I was quitting." On October 19, 2011, shortly after the release of the game, Hamill announced his retirement on his Twitter account, saying "Hello/Goodbye Joker! I've enjoyed every minute behind the wheel of the Clown Prince's crazy car – I'm going to miss him more than I can say!!". In June 2012, WB Games released the expansion pack titled "The Last Laugh" for the video game DC Universe Online, featuring Hamill as the Joker. In 2015, Hamill yet again returned as the Joker in Batman: Arkham Knight with the character recurring through the game as a hallucination.

During a 2011 Comic-Con, when asked about Heath Ledger's Oscar-winning portrayal of the character in Christopher Nolan's The Dark Knight, Hamill claimed that it was the most original performance that he had ever seen since Anthony Hopkins' Oscar-winning portrayal of Hannibal Lecter in The Silence of the Lambs.

Hamill has commented that if there would ever be an animated version of Batman: The Killing Joke, he would gladly voice the Joker again, encouraging fans to campaign for said adaptation. On July 17, 2015, Hamill tweeted that he had his fingers crossed in hopes that he would be contacted to reprise his role as the Joker in the animated adaptation. On July 27, Collider reported that Hamill would voice the Joker in the film. The film was released in theaters for a two-day limited time. It was released on Digital HD on July 27, 2016. It was released on DVD and Blu-ray on August 2. Despite the film's mixed reviews, positive reception was met for Hamill's performance as the Joker, with some citing it as his best performance of the character.

Hamill reprised the Joker for the animated series Justice League Action. He also reprised the Trickster for the series, as well as voicing Swamp Thing. In the animated short "Missing the Mark", Hamill voices a fictionalized version of himself, who appears alongside all three of his other characters. Hamill once again voiced Joker in Lego DC Super-Villains, replacing voice actor Christopher Corey Smith.

Hamill has been nominated for two Annie Awards for his portrayal of the character, for an Interactive Achievement Award, for a Spike Video Game Award, and has won a British Academy Video Game Award for Best Performer.

In January 2023, Hamill revealed in an interview that he would likely never voice the Joker again in light of Kevin Conroy's death in 2022, stating that "Without Kevin there, there doesn't seem to be a Batman for me."

Writing
Hamill is the co-writer of The Black Pearl, a comic book miniseries published by Dark Horse Comics. He wrote an introduction to the Trade Paperback Batman: Riddler Two-Face which reprints various stories involving the Riddler and Two-Face to tie in with Batman Forever. He has also written several stories for Simpsons Comics, including "Catastrophe in Substitute Springfields!", which parodies DC's Crisis on Infinite Earths and also references several other classic comics.

Personal life
According to a 1981 profile in People, Hamill's "first serious love" was actor Anne Wyndham, cast as his sister on General Hospital, with whom he had an offscreen relationship. He would later describe experiencing seasons of on-set awkwardness while working with her after their relationship ended. In a 2017 interview, he attributed his long, happy marriage to a non-actor to learning, through his relationship with Wyndham, the dangers of being in a relationship with a fellow actor.

On December 17, 1978, Hamill married dental hygienist Marilou York in a private civil ceremony. They have three children: Nathan Elias (born June 1979), Griffin Tobias (born March 1983), and Chelsea Elizabeth (born July 1988). Nathan was born during the production of The Empire Strikes Back and had a cameo appearance as one of the Royal Guards of Naboo in Star Wars: Episode I – The Phantom Menace. Chelsea made a photographic appearance as an infant Axel Walker in the 1990 television series The Flash; the same photograph was used in the 2014 series. All three have cameos as Resistance soldiers in The Last Jedi.

On January 11, 1977, before shooting one of his scenes in Star Wars, Hamill was in a car accident in which he fractured his nose and left cheekbone. As a result, a double was used for the landspeeder pickup shots. According to a recorded interview, he was driving his BMW on a freeway, became distracted, and seeing that he was missing his offramp, attempted to negotiate four lanes of traffic. Hamill later said that the stories surrounding his injuries had become exaggerated. Confirming that he had only broken his nose, he observed that "over the years it's [been] built up into having my face reconstructed with plastic surgery."

Hamill is an outspoken advocate of the Democratic Party and has supported its candidates. Prior to the 2012 presidential election, he referred to Mitt Romney as a "snake oil salesman". He endorsed P.G. Sittenfeld in the 2016 Ohio Senate election. He has also criticized the tweets of Donald Trump by reading them out in his Joker voice.

Hamill is a lifelong fan of Laurel and Hardy. In June 2016, he called into The Ross Owen Show on Black Sky Radio to talk for over an hour about his passion for Stan and Ollie. He was also an early fan of David Letterman, having occasionally appeared on Late Night with David Letterman, as well as taping every episode and keeping a journal documenting the show. After encountering writer Chris Elliott, Hamill was asked for assistance in helping determine the 1,000th Viewer Mail that Letterman had answered. His practice continued to Letterman's new show on CBS, but eventually stopped.

He became a supporter of English football club Wolverhampton Wanderers F.C. in 2017.

In December 2017, Hamill became an affiliate member of the Royal Society of Chemistry, having had an interest in the science since childhood.

During the 2022 Brazilian general election, he declared his support for former president and presidential candidate Luiz Inácio Lula da Silva.

Filmography

Written works

Forewords

Comics

Awards and nominations

See also 
 Asteroid 110026 Hamill

Notes

References

External links

1951 births
Living people
20th-century American male actors
21st-century American male actors
20th-century American writers
21st-century American writers
20th-century American male writers
American comics writers
American expatriates in Japan
American male film actors
American male soap opera actors
American male stage actors
American male television actors
American male video game actors
American male voice actors
American people of English descent
American people of Irish descent
American people of Scottish descent
American people of Swedish descent
American people of Welsh descent
Annandale High School alumni
BAFTA winners (people)
California Democrats
Inkpot Award winners
Los Angeles City College alumni
Male actors from Oakland, California
Writers from Oakland, California